Maurice Rosy (17 November 1927 – 23 February 2013), was a Belgian comics writer who also worked as artistic director of Spirou magazine during its golden period.

Biography
Rosy was born in Fontaine-l'Évêque.  He was employed by Charles Dupuis in 1954 as "giver of ideas" at the Franco-Belgian comics magazine Spirou. Two years later he assumed the position of artistic director, which he remained until 1971. Along with Yvan Delporte, he is credited with responsibility of the magazine's success during the 1950s and 1960s.

In the early 1950s he wrote scenarios for André Franquin's series Spirou et Fantasio, and Jijé's Jerry Spring, before he took over the writing of Tif et Tondu from Luc Bermar, collaborating with Will over a period of thirteen years. As Spirou took to publishing the mini–récit (mini story booklets) Rosy had a hand in the creation of new series that began in this format, and in 1959 Rosy worked with Jean Roba to create the series Boule et Bill. In 1961 he collaborated with Paul Deliège to create Bobo. After working on Bobo for several years, even as artist on occasions, he created the series Attila in 1967, illustrated by Derib.

Bibliography

References

 Maurice Rosy publications in Spirou BBoubliées 
 Maurice Rosy albums Bedetheque

Notes

External links
 Maurice Rosy biography on Lambiek Comiclopedia

1927 births
Belgian comics writers
2013 deaths